The Federal Office for Approvals in Telecommunications (German: , BZT) was a federal agency in Germany responsible for approving telecommunication devices. It was seated in Saarbrücken.

History 
The BZT was founded in 1982.

Criticism  
Because cheap modems from the United States were banned, the Chaos Computer Club published schematics of modems. The  became well known.

References 

German federal agencies
Government agencies established in 1982
Government agencies disestablished in 1997
1982 establishments in Germany
1997 disestablishments in Germany
History of telecommunications in Germany
Organisations based in Saarland
Saarbrücken
Telecommunications regulatory authorities